V – Metal Machine Music is the ninth album by German Industrial/EBM band Die Krupps. It was released on 28 August 2015 as digital download and double CD as well as limited bundles.

Background

The album sees the band returning "to a distinctly guitar-heavy sound". The album derives its name from one of the band's earlier tracks, "Metal Machine Music", a single off the Album I, itself a tribute to Lou Reed's album Metal Machine Music, which Jürgen Engler credits as a strong influence on the band.

"Die Verdammten" is a guitar enriched rework of the tour intro the band had used on their 2011 and 2014 tours. "The Vampire Strikes Back" is a rework of a song previously released on a Wing Commander original soundtrack album in 1998, thus being the band's last song recorded prior to its temporary breakup. "Alive in a Glass Cage", "Road Rage Warrior" and "Volle Kraft voraus" are also older songs that were re-recorded. "The Red Line" was first released in an alternate version in 2014 as a B-Side to the "Robo Sapien" single.

Reception
Alex Boniwell from Terrorizer thought that the album is "reminiscent of their late '80s/early '90s output but with a bigger, crunchier production" and wrote, "'V' gives out what you'd expect from these consistently good pioneers of industrial – solid, pounding beats, thick danceable riffs, great synth sounds and a gloriously sneering vocal from Die Krupps main man Jürgen Engler".

Track listing

Singles
"Battle Extreme / Fly Martyrs Fly" was released two weeks prior to the album with a lyric video accompanying the A-Side. "Kaltes Herz" followed in late 2015, with "Branded" as the B-Side, supported by a promo video directed by Faderhead. "Alive in a Glass Cage" was released prior to the band's first ever Wacken Open Air gig. The track was re-recorded as a collaboration with Caliban. The single featured a remix of the title track by Chant, a project of Die Krupps' 2014 live drummer, and a live recording of "Nazis on Speed" in Berlin from 2015. Video footage for another promo clip, "Road Rage Warrior", was shot during the "Kaltes Herz" recording session according to the official band page, but has not been released to date.

Personnel
Die Krupps
 Jürgen Engler – vocals, keyboards, guitar on "Alive in a Glass Cage", cover concept, recording, production
 Ralf Dörper – noise-synthetics
 Marcel Zürcher – guitars, keyboards

Technical personnel
 Chris Lietz – production
 Alex Henke – additional guitar recording
 Franz Schepers – band photo
 Éric Débris – photos (Jürgen Engler, hot rod)
 Dennis Hom – hot rod (front cover)
 Jennifer Heibel – hot rod (booklet)
 Darrell Heibel – hot rod (booklet)
 Sascha Osterland – artwork

Chart positions

References

Die Krupps albums
2015 albums